In mathematics, particularly topology, the K-topology is a topology that one can impose on the set of all real numbers which has some interesting properties. Relative to the set of all real numbers carrying the standard topology, the set K = {1/n | n is a positive integer} is not closed since it doesn't contain its (only) limit point 0. Relative to the K-topology however, the set K is automatically decreed to be closed by adding ‘more’ basis elements to the standard topology on R. Basically, the K-topology on R is strictly finer than the standard topology on R. It is mostly useful for counterexamples in basic topology.

Formal definition

Let R be the set of all real numbers and let K = {1/n | n is a positive integer}. Generate a topology on R by taking basis as all open intervals (a, b) and all sets of the form (a, b) – K (the set of all elements in (a, b) that are not in K). The topology generated is known as the K-topology on R.

The sets described in the definition form a basis (they satisfy the conditions to be a basis).

Properties and examples

Throughout this section, T will denote the K-topology and (R, T) will denote the set of all real numbers with the K-topology as a topological space.

1. The topology T on R is strictly finer than the standard topology on R but not comparable with the lower limit topology on R

2. From the previous example, it follows that (R, T) is not compact

3. (R, T) is Hausdorff but not regular. The fact that it is Hausdorff follows from the first property. It is not regular since the closed set K and the point {0} have no disjoint neighbourhoods about them

4. Surprisingly enough, (R, T) is a connected topological space. However, (R, T) is not path connected; it has precisely two path components: (−∞, 0] and (0, +∞)

5. (R, T) is not locally path connected (since its path components are not equal to its components). It is also not locally connected at {0} but it is locally connected everywhere else

6. The closed interval [0,1] is not compact as a subspace of (R, T) since it is not even limit point compact (K is an infinite subspace of [0,1] that has no limit point in [0,1])

7. In fact, no subspace of (R, T) containing K can be compact. If A were a subspace of (R, T) containing K, K would have no limit point in A so that A can not be limit point compact. Therefore, A cannot be compact

8. The quotient space of (R, T) obtained by collapsing K to a point is not Hausdorff. K is distinct from 0, but can't be separated from 0 by disjoint open sets.

See also 

 Connected space
 List of topologies
 Locally connected space
 Lower limit topology
 Natural topology
 Sequence

References

 

Topological spaces